was a Japanese professional sumo wrestler from Oita City. He made his debut in 1915. He won two top division tournament championships. His highest rank was ōzeki. He retired in 1930 and became a sumo coach.

Early life
Born , he had a very large build from a young age. When he was registered for military service at age twenty he measured in at 181 centimeters tall and weighed 80 kilograms. When he joined the Kokura artillery battery, his size was noticed by his commanding officer and he was released from service to enter professional sumo.

Career
The expectations placed on Takahashi when he debuted in sumo are clear from his initial shikona or ring name of  that he was given. It combined one of the characters from the name of recently retired Hitachiyama with one of the characters from the former ring name of the then current yokozuna Nishinoumi Kajirō II, which had been . From his entry into sumo in January 1915, he lived up to these expectations and rose steadily through the ranks. In his fourth tournament in January 1917, at jonidan 12 he earned his first championship with a 5–0 record. After four more years of tournaments with straight winning records he reached the top-tier makuuchi division in the May 1921 tournament. In this tournament his record was 4–5 with one draw. This was his first losing tournament in over six years of sumo. He was demoted to jūryō 1 for the following January 1922 tournament. A 5–3 record was enough to put him back into makuuchi for the next tournament, where he would remain for the rest of his career. His success continued and he rose steadily through the ranks of maegashira and a very strong showing of 9–2 at the rank of komusubi in May 1926 would see him promoted to sekiwake. All three of his sekiwake appearances were winning records and in his second and third tournaments at sekiwake he came in second to yokozuna Tsunenohana for the championship. He was promoted to ōzeki for the following October 1927 tournament. In his rise to ōzeki after his initial losing tournament in his makuuchi debut in May 1921, he had only recorded one more losing record in a span of over six years. Ironically, he would miss his entire first tournament at ōzeki due to a bout of influenza. Two tournaments after becoming an ōzeki he changed his name to Toyokuni Fukuma because a sumo elder in Osaka sumo had the name Onogawa. As an ōzeki, Toyokuni's winning streak continued, and in the January 1929 tournament he would come one win short of the championship, losing it to then sekiwake Tamanishiki. The following March tournament, Toyokuni attained his first makuuchi championship. Two tournaments later, in September of the same year he was again the runner up for the championship. The following tournament in January 1930 he attained his second and final makuuchi championship. The following tournament in March of that year, he would finally record his first losing tournament in the san'yaku ranks. He bounced back in the following May tournament with an 8–3 record, but in the subsequent October tournament he withdrew due to a back injury after achieving only a 1–3 record. Afterwards, he soon announced his retirement.

Post wrestler life
Upon retiring, Toyokuni would take the elder name  and soon after became the head of Kokonoe stable, a previous incarnation of the current Kokonoe stable. Later on his health began to suffer and in May 1937 he was obliged to disband the stable and his wrestlers moved to Asahiyama stable. He died in May 1942 at the age of 48.

Career record
In 1927 Tokyo and Osaka sumo merged and four tournaments a year in Tokyo and other locations began to be held.

See also
Glossary of sumo terms
List of sumo tournament top division champions
List of past sumo wrestlers
List of ōzeki

References

1893 births
1942 deaths
Sumo people from Ōita Prefecture
Japanese sumo wrestlers
Ōzeki